The Pomo are an Indigenous People of California.

Pomo may also refer to:

 Pomo languages, a language family of the Pomo People
 the Pomo dialect of the Pol language, spoken in the Republic of the Congo
 Pomo religion, religion of the Pomo People
 Pomo, California, an unincorporated community
 Postmodernism, often shortened to po-mo or pomo
 Permanent open market operations, the buying and selling of government bonds